Anthony Wrona - (b. 1926 - d. 2000) was an influential American  Luthier (violin maker) and Archetier (bow maker).

He was born in Buffalo, NY. As a youngster, was fascinated by making instruments (of the violin family).
He served in World War II, and came back a paraplegic (after a spinal injury). 
Learned the trade/violin making and restoration from Simone Fernando Sacconi and worked for Rembert Wurlitzer Co.’s fine-instrument repair department.
After the closing of the Wurlitzer shop (in 1971), worked on his own.

External links
 In Memoriam - Anthony Wrona

"Wrona continued working for more than 30 years, making violins and occasionally repairing instruments. Sometimes dealing with difficult medical complications and chronic pain, he maintained a positive outlook till the end. He has inspired those who knew him not to let handicaps getting in the way and demonstrated that you can create great beauty despite obstacles."

References

Strings magazine, February/March 2001, No.92

John H. Fairfield - Known Violin Makers
Loan Exhibition Stringed Instruments and Bows NYV 1966 (commemorating the 70th birthday of Simone Fernando Sacconi).

1926 births
2000 deaths
Bow makers
American luthiers
People from Buffalo, New York